Inga-Bodil Vetterlund (30 January 1914 – 14 September 1980) was a Swedish film and stage actress.

Selected filmography

 Charlotte Löwensköld (1930)
 Pettersson - Sverige (1934)
 Adventure in Pyjamas (1935)
 Söder om landsvägen (1936)
 Poor Millionaires (1936)
 The Andersson Family (1937)
 Sun Over Sweden (1938)
 Alle man på post (1940)
 Fransson the Terrible (1941)
 Tre glada tokar (1942)
 Aktören (1943)
 Som folk är mest (1944)
 Sabotage (1944)
 The Green Lift (1944)
 Tired Theodore (1945)
 Between Brothers (1946)
 Sällskapslek (1963)

References

Further reading

External links

1914 births
1980 deaths
20th-century Swedish actresses